Guld & glöd is a Sven-Ingvars live album released on 14 August 2002, recorded at Tyrol in Stockholm on 12 April 2002.

Track listing
Intro ; Nio liv (P. Jonsson)
Medley: Lika ung som då, Gamla polare (N. Strömstedt ; B. Månson)
Högt i det blå (P. Gessle)
Diana (P. Anka)
Rock & roll-medley (M. Freedman, J. Deknight, B. Bryant, D. Watson, trad., D. Covay, J. Berry, J. Leiber, M. Stoller)
Det kommer från hjärtat (P. Fransson, P. Karlsson)
Te dans mä Karlstatösera (R. Lindström, E. Uppström)
Fröken Fräken (T. Skogman)
En prästkrage i min hand (G. Rybrant, O. Thiel)
Ett litet rött paket (O. Thörnqvist)
Önskebrunnen (R. Wallebom)
Luffarvisa (M. Nilsson)
Kristina från Vilhelmina (R. Wallebom)
Det var dans bort i vägen (G. Fröding, H. Lambert)
Anita (G. Fröding, S.-E. Magnusson)
Marie, Marie (S. Hellstrand)
Två mörka ögon (B. Månson)
Akustiskt medley (I. Hellberg, R. Wallebom, J. Waard, L. Berghagen, D.A. Winter, C. Desage, K. Lindén)
Min gitarr (T. Skogman, S.-E. Magnusson)
Så många mil, så många år (D. Hylander)
Jag ringer på fredag (I. Hellberg)
Byns enda blondin (N. Strömstedt)
Kyss mej stilla (P. LeMarc)
Torparrock (G. Johansson)
Börja om från början (R. Wallebom)
Någon att hålla i hand (C. Thomas, T. Connor, A. Forss)
När rocken kom till byn (P. Bäckman, S.-E. Magnusson)
Juninatten (T. Styffe, S.-E. Magnusson)

Charts

References 

2002 live albums
Live albums by Swedish artists
Sven-Ingvars albums